Di-tert-butyl peroxide or DTBP is an organic compound consisting of a peroxide group bonded to two tert-butyl groups. It is one of the most stable organic peroxides, due to the tert-butyl groups being bulky. It is a colorless liquid.

Reactions
The peroxide bond undergoes homolysis at temperatures above 100 °C.  For this reason di-tert-butyl peroxide is commonly used as a radical initiator in organic synthesis and polymer chemistry. The decomposition reaction proceeds via the generation of methyl radicals.
(CH3)3COOC(CH3)3 → 2 (CH3)3CO•
(CH3)3CO• → (CH3)2CO + 
2  → C2H6

DTBP can in principle be used in engines where oxygen is limited, since the molecule supplies both the oxidizer and the fuel.

Toxicity 
DTBP is an irritant to the nose, eyes, and skin. It is also flammable, so it should be handled with care.

See also
tert-Butyl hydroperoxide

References

External links

Organic peroxides
Fuels
Propellants
Radical initiators
Tert-butyl compounds